Fuzzballs are theorized by some superstring theory scientists to be the true quantum description of black holes. The theory attempts to resolve two intractable problems that classic black holes pose for modern physics:

 The information paradox wherein the quantum information bound in in-falling matter and energy entirely disappears into a singularity; that is, the black hole would undergo zero physical change in its composition regardless of the nature of what fell into it.
 The singularity at the heart of the black hole, where conventional black hole theory says there is infinite spacetime curvature due to an infinitely intense gravitational field from a region of zero volume. Modern physics breaks down when such parameters are infinite and zero.

Fuzzball theory replaces the singularity at the heart of a black hole by positing that the entire region within the black hole's event horizon is actually a ball of strings, which are advanced as the ultimate building blocks of matter and energy. Strings are thought to be bundles of energy vibrating in complex ways in both the three physical dimensions of space as well as in compact directions—extra dimensions interwoven in the quantum foam (also known as spacetime foam).

Physical characteristics

Samir D. Mathur of Ohio State University, with postdoctoral researcher Oleg Lunin, proposed via two papers in 2002 that black holes are actually spheres of strings  with a definite volume; they are not a singularity, which the classic view holds to be a zero-dimensional, zero-volume point into which a black hole's entire mass is concentrated.

String theory holds that the fundamental constituents of subatomic particles, including the force carriers (e.g. bosons, photons, and gluons), are all composed of a one-dimensional string of energy that takes on its identity by vibrating in different modes and/or frequencies. Quite unlike the view of a black hole as a singularity, a small fuzzball can be thought of as an extra-dense neutron star where its neutrons have decomposed, or "melted", liberating the quarks (strings in string theory) composing them. Accordingly, fuzzballs can be regarded as the most extreme form of degenerate matter.

Whereas the event horizon of a classic black hole is thought to be very well defined and distinct, Mathur and Lunin further calculated that the event horizon of a fuzzball would, at an extremely small scale (likely on the order of a few Planck lengths), be very much like a mist: fuzzy, hence the name "fuzzball". They also found that the physical surface of the fuzzball would have a radius equal to that of the event horizon of a classic black hole; for both, the Schwarzschild radius for a median-size stellar-mass black hole of 6.8 solar masses is 20 kilometers.

With classical-model black holes, objects passing through the event horizon on their way to the singularity are thought to enter a realm of curved spacetime where the escape velocity exceeds the speed of light. It is a realm that is devoid of all structure. Further, at the singularity—the heart of a classic black hole—spacetime is thought to have infinite curvature (that is, gravity is thought to have infinite intensity) since its mass is believed to have collapsed to zero (infinitely small) volume where it has infinite density. Such infinite conditions are problematic with known physics because key calculations are not able to be computed with a divisor of zero. With the fuzzball model, however, the strings comprising an object are believed to simply fall onto and absorb into the surface of the fuzzball, which corresponds to the event horizon—the threshold at which the escape velocity equals the speed of light.

A fuzzball is a black hole; spacetime, photons, and all else that is not exquisitely close to the surface of a fuzzball are thought to be affected in precisely the same fashion as with the classical model of black holes featuring a singularity at its center. The two theories differ only at the quantum level; that is, they differ only in their internal composition as well as how they affect virtual particles that form close to their event horizons (see , below). Fuzzball theory is thought by its proponents to be the true quantum description of black holes.

Since the volume of fuzzballs is a function of the Schwarzschild radius (2,954 m per ), fuzzballs have a variable density that decreases as the inverse square of their mass (twice the mass is twice the diameter, which is eight times the volume, resulting in one-quarter the density). A bit of such a fuzzball the size of a drop of water would have a mass of twenty million metric tons, which is the mass of a granite ball 240 meters in diameter.

Though such densities are almost unimaginably extreme, they are, mathematically speaking, infinitely far from infinite density. Although the densities of typical stellar-mass fuzzballs are quite great—about the same as neutron stars.—their densities are many orders of magnitude less than the Planck density, which is equivalent to the mass of the universe packed into the volume of a single atomic nucleus.

Fuzzballs become less dense as their mass increases due to fractional tension. When matter or energy (strings) fall onto a fuzzball, more strings are not simply added to the fuzzball; strings fuse together, and in doing so, all the quantum information of the infalling strings becomes part of larger, more complex strings. Due to fractional tension, string tension exponentially decreases as they become more complex with more modes of vibration, relaxing to considerable lengths. The "mathematical beauty" of the string theory formulas Mathur and Lunin employed lies in how the fractional tension values produce fuzzball radii that precisely equal Schwarzschild radii, which Karl Schwarzschild calculated using an entirely different mathematical technique 87 years earlier.

Due to the mass-density inverse-square rule, fuzzballs need not all have unimaginable densities. There are also supermassive black holes, which are found at the center of virtually all galaxies. Sagittarius A*, the black hole at the center of our Milky Way galaxy, is 4.3 million . If fuzzball theory is correct, it has a mean density that is "only" 51 times that of gold.

At 3.9 billion  (a rather large super-massive black hole), a fuzzball would have a radius of 77 astronomical units—about the same size as the termination shock of the Solar System's heliosphere—and a mean density equal to that of the Earth's atmosphere at sea level (1.2 kg/m3).

Irrespective of a fuzzball's mass and resultant density, the determining factor establishing where its surface lies is the threshold at which the fuzzball's escape velocity precisely equals the speed of light. Escape velocity, as its name suggests, is the velocity a body must achieve to escape from a massive object. For Earth, this is 11.2 km/s. In the other direction, a massive object's escape velocity is equal to the impact velocity achieved by a falling body that has fallen from the edge of a massive object's sphere of gravitational influence. Thus, event horizons—for both classic black holes and fuzzballs—lie precisely at the point where spacetime has warped to such an extent that falling bodies just achieve the speed of light. According to Albert Einstein, via his special theory of relativity, the speed of light is the maximum permissible velocity in spacetime. At this velocity, infalling matter and energy impacts the surface of the fuzzball and its now-liberated, individual strings contribute to the fuzzball's makeup.

Information paradox

Classical black holes create a problem for physics known as the black hole information paradox, an issue first raised in 1972 by Jacob Bekenstein and later popularized by Stephen Hawking. The information paradox is born out of the realization that all the quantum nature (information) of the matter and energy that falls into a classic black hole is thought to entirely vanish from existence into the zero-volume singularity at its heart. For instance, a black hole that is feeding on the stellar atmosphere (protons, neutrons, and electrons) from a nearby companion star should, if it obeyed the known laws of quantum mechanics, technically grow to be increasingly different in composition from one that is feeding on light (photons) from neighboring stars. Yet, the implications of classic black hole theory are inescapable: other than the fact that the two classic black holes would become increasingly massive due to the infalling matter and energy, they would undergo zero change in their relative composition because their singularities have no composition. Bekenstein noted that this theorized outcome violated the quantum mechanical law of reversibility, which essentially holds that quantum information must not be lost in any process. This field of study is today known as black hole thermodynamics.

Even if quantum information was not extinguished in the singularity of a classic black hole and it somehow still existed, quantum data would be unable to climb up against infinite gravitational intensity to reach the surface of its event horizon and escape. Hawking radiation (so-far undetected particles and photons thought to be emitted from the proximity of black holes) would not circumvent the information paradox; it could reveal only the mass, angular momentum, and electric charge of classic black holes. Hawking radiation is thought to be created when virtual particles— antiparticle pairs of all sorts plus photons, which are their own antiparticle—form very close to the event horizon and one member of a pair spirals in while the other escapes, carrying away the energy of the black hole.

The fuzzball theory advanced by Mathur and Lunin satisfies the law of reversibility because the quantum nature of all the strings that fall into a fuzzball is preserved as new strings contribute to the fuzzball's makeup; no quantum information is squashed out of existence. Moreover, this aspect of the theory is testable since its central tenet holds that a fuzzball's quantum data do not stay trapped at its center but reach up to its fuzzy surface and that Hawking radiation carries away this information, which is encoded in the delicate correlations between the outgoing quanta.

See also

 Supermassive black hole
 Black hole information paradox
 Black hole thermodynamics
 Degenerate matter
 Gravitational singularity
 Neutron star
 Quantum foam
 Spacetime
 String (physics)
 String theory
 Superstring theory
 Timeline of black hole physics
 Black star (semiclassical gravity)
 Planck star

Notes and references

External links 
 Are Black Holes Fuzzballs? — by Space Today Online
 Information paradox solved? If so, Black Holes are "Fuzzballs" — by The Ohio State University
 The fuzzball paradigm for black holes: FAQ — by Samir D. Mathur
 arXiv.org link: Unwinding of strings thrown into a fuzzball — by Stefano Giusto and Samir D. Mathur
 Astronomers take virtual plunge into black hole (84 MB) (10 MB version)— 40-second animation produced by JILA, which is a joint venture of the University of Colorado at Boulder and the NIST
 The black hole information problem and the fuzzball proposal (I), CERN document
 The black hole information problem and the fuzzball proposal (II), CERN document
 The black hole information paradox and the fuzzball proposal (III), CERN document
 The black hole information problem and the fuzzball proposal (IV), CERN document
  - by Jennifer Ouellete

String theory
Black holes
Hypothetical stars
Stellar black holes